United Nations Security Council Resolution 1683, adopted unanimously on June 13, 2006, after recalling all previous resolutions on the situation in Liberia and West Africa, the Council adjusted the arms embargo against the country so that weapons and ammunition could be used for training purposes by the government, police and security forces.

Liberia welcomed the resolution, but urged sanctions relating to timber and diamonds to be lifted.

Resolution

Observations
The Council began by welcoming the role of President Ellen Johnson Sirleaf in her efforts to restore, peace and stability to Liberia. It emphasised that the United Nations Mission in Liberia (UNMIL) would support the Liberian government to build a democratic nation.

The resolution recognised that the Liberian police and security forces needed to assume greater responsibility for national security. Furthermore, progress had been made in Liberia but the situation continued to constitute a threat to peace and security in the region.

Acts
Under Chapter VII of the United Nations Charter, the Council decided that measures imposed in Resolution 1521 (2003) would not apply to weapons and ammunition supplied to members of the government, security service and police for training purposes.  The items would be approved on a case-by-case basis by the Committee established in that resolution only for the use of personnel trained and vetted since UNMIL's inception in October 2003.

Furthermore, weapons and ammunition requested would subsequently be marked and a registry of them maintained. UNMIL was required to inspect inventories of weapons and ammunition obtained and report to the Committee on its findings.

Finally, the resolution reiterated the continuing importance of UNMIL co-operation with the Committee, Liberian government and expert panel monitoring the implementation of sanctions against the country.

See also
 List of United Nations Security Council Resolutions 1601 to 1700 (2005–2006)
 Second Liberian Civil War

References

External links
 
Text of the Resolution at undocs.org

 1683
 1683
2006 in Liberia
June 2006 events